Auburn Road Vineyards is a winery in Pilesgrove Township in Salem County, New Jersey. The vineyard was first planted in 2004, and opened to the public in 2007. Auburn Road has 19 acres of grapes under cultivation, and produces 4,200 cases of wine per year. The winery is named for road near where it is located.

Wines
Auburn Road Vineyards is in the Outer Coastal Plain AVA, and produces wine from Cabernet Franc, Cabernet Sauvignon, Cayuga White, Chambourcin, Chardonnay, Merlot, Niagara, Pinot gris, Sangiovese, and Vidal blanc grapes. Auburn Road also makes fruit wines from apples and peaches

Advocacy, features, licensing, and associations
Auburn Road is an advocate of the direct shipping of wine from wineries to customers. The winery operates a bistro that sells cheeses, soups, and breads, and serves dinner on Friday night. Auburn Road has a plenary winery license from the New Jersey Division of Alcoholic Beverage Control, which allows it to produce an unrestricted amount of wine, operate up to 15 off-premises sales rooms, and ship up to 12 cases per year to consumers in-state or out-of-state. The winery is a member of the Garden State Wine Growers Association and the Outer Coastal Plain Vineyard Association.

See also
Alcohol laws of New Jersey
American wine
Judgment of Princeton
List of wineries, breweries, and distilleries in New Jersey
New Jersey Farm Winery Act
New Jersey Wine Industry Advisory Council
New Jersey wine

References

External links
Garden State Wine Growers Association
Outer Coastal Plain Vineyard Association

Wineries in New Jersey
Tourist attractions in Salem County, New Jersey
2007 establishments in New Jersey
Pilesgrove Township, New Jersey